Tri-M Music Honor Society, formerly known as Modern Music Masters, is an American high school and middle school music honor society. A program of the National Association for Music Education (NAfME), it is designed to recognize students for their academic and musical achievements and to provide leadership and service opportunities to young musicians. There are approximately 6200 participating chapters in several countries, each of which is run by the students but supervised by an advisor or sponsor, usually a school teacher.

To be eligible for membership, a student must maintain an A average in their music classes, a C average in all of their academic courses, be presently enrolled in a music course at their school, and be recommended for membership by their school's music faculty.

Tri-M was founded in 1936 by Alexander Harley and his wife, Frances. At the time, Alexander Harley was the band director and Music Department Chairman at Maine Township High School East in Park Ridge, Illinois. It has been a program of MENC: The National Association for Music Education since 1983.  In 2011, the name MENC was changed to NAfME or the National Association for Music Education.

History 

In 1935, Charles Himmel, Principal of Maine Township High School (Now Maine Township High School East) in Des Plaines/Park Ridge, Illinois approached Music Department Chairman Alexander M. Harley about beginning a music honor society for high school music students.  Harley, along with his wife Frances began formulating a plan; they decided that the initiates should be among the finest technical and academic musicians at the high school. The entrance requirements were rigorous.  In 1936, they initiated the first members of the "Maine Music Masters."  One of the first debates of this organization was whether to refer to themselves as TRI-M or 3M.  For almost twenty years this organization worked to promote the values of service to the music program, the school, and the community.  They were one of the first school organizations to organize canned food and clothing drives and community concerts at nursing homes, civic organizations, and community events.  In one school year, the members of TRI-M presented over 300 concerts.

National expansion 

In 1952, Maine Township High School Superintendent Harry D. Anderson attended the initiation of TRI-M and felt the organization could have broad appeal to other high schools. He urged Harley to incorporate. With the help of the History Department, TRI-M was incorporated as "Modern Music Masters." Its membership steadily grew and it became an international organization with chapters as far away as Asia and Europe. Harley and his wife traversed the country to start chapters.

International expansion 
There is a Tri-M chapter in The Baptist school Amman, located in Jordan. The Yongsan International School of Seoul also fosters Korea's first Junior Chapter Tri-M, as well as a Senior Chapter. The International School Manila also has its own chapter of Tri-M in its high school. Seoul Foreign School, Concordia International School Shanghai,International School of Kuala Lumpur, Taipei American School, Singapore American School, Colegio Franklin Delano Roosevelt, Shanghai American School, Nansha College Preparatory Academy, International Christian School, Korea International School Jeju, and The American School of Dubai also have Tri-M Music Honor Society chapters. The American Community School of Abu Dhabi and The American School of Doha have thriving chapters as well.

Program of MENC 
In 1983, the "Modern Music Masters" officially became a program of the Music Educators National Conference.  Its name was changed to the TRI-M Music Honor Society and presently there are over 6200 chapters worldwide.  TRI-M continues to promote the ideals of service to the school music program, the school-at-large, and the community.

Alexander Harley died in 1989 and at his funeral, the school flags from the four Maine High Schools, carried by the TRI-M Presidents, were processed in honoring the vision of this man and his vision for music students everywhere.  Frances died in 2004.

Awards and honors

Throughout the years, there have been many ways that individuals and chapters can be recognized for their accomplishments to both Tri-M and their local school:

 Chapter of the Year
 Top Notcher
 Honorary Membership

References

External links
 Tri-M website

High school honor societies